Jacob Blessing the Sons of Joseph is a 1656 oil painting by Dutch artist Rembrandt van Rijn. It is said to have almost “a sculptural surface with a translucent glaze over paint”.  This piece is housed in the Gemäldegalerie Alte Meister in Kassel, Germany. The painting was commissioned by the Amsterdam patrician Willem Schrijver. It shows him with his wife Wendela de Graeff and their children as biblical figures.

Background
Jacob Blessing the Sons of Joseph shows a scene from the Old Testament book of Genesis, Chapter 48.  In this scene, Joseph brings his two sons (Manasseh and Ephraim) to his dying father Jacob so that they can receive the family blessing. According to tradition, the eldest son is blessed with the patriarch’s right hand.  However, Jacob deliberately crossed his arms and put his right hand on Ephraim’s (the younger son’s) head and his left hand on Manasseh’s (the oldest son’s) head. Joseph was displeased and thought that his father was making a mistake. When Joseph tried to correct his father, Jacob refused and told Joseph that he was purposefully blessing the younger son.

Asenath
Asenath was the daughter of an Egyptian priest. According to chapter 41 in the book of Genesis, she was given to Joseph by the pharaoh, himself. The purpose of adding Asenath to the painting is because it having been commissioned by the Amsterdam patrician Willem Schrijver, It shows him with his wife Wendela de Graeff and their children as biblical figures.".

Artistic qualities
Rembrandt is famous for his use of light and shadow (Chiaroscuro) and Jacob Blessing the Sons of Joseph is not an exception.  This draws attention to the main characters of Jacob, Joseph, Ephraim, Manasseh, and Asenath while obscuring the background. In particular, there seems to be a halo surrounding Ephraim as he is being blessed. Also notable is the prominent colors that Rembrandt used. The yellows, browns, and reds give the painting a mood that is “both intimate and sacred, tender and solemn”.

References

Paintings by Rembrandt
1656 paintings
Paintings depicting Jacob
Paintings in the collection of the Gemäldegalerie Alte Meister (Kassel)
Paintings of children